SM U-45 was one of the 329 submarines serving in the Imperial German Navy in World War I. 
U-45 was engaged in the naval warfare and took part in the First Battle of the Atlantic.

U-45 was torpedoed and sunk in the Atlantic Ocean northwest of the Shetland Islands by the Royal Navy submarine  on 12 September 1917 with the loss of 43 of her 45 crewmen.

Summary of raiding history

References

Notes

Citations

Bibliography

World War I submarines of Germany
1914 ships
Ships built in Danzig
U-boats commissioned in 1915
Maritime incidents in 1917
U-boats sunk in 1917
U-boats sunk by British submarines
Type U 43 submarines
World War I shipwrecks in the Atlantic Ocean